Jéssica Sodré (born July 21, 1985) is a Brazilian television actress.

Early life
She was born in Nilópolis, Rio de Janeiro, Brazil.

Career
Sodré is best known for her work on telenovelas, including Senhora do Destino and Prova de Amor.

External links 

1985 births
Brazilian television actresses
Living people
People from Nilópolis